Henry Reynolds may refer to:

 Henry Reynolds (archaeologist) (died ), archaeologist in Georgia, US
 Henry Reynolds (cricketer) (1844–1894), English cricketer
 Henry Reynolds (historian) (born 1938), Australian historian
 Henry Reynolds (poet) (1564–1632), English poet and critic
 Henry Reynolds (VC) (1883–1948), English World War I recipient of the Victoria Cross
 Henry Chidley Reynolds (1849–1925), New Zealand farm manager, butter manufacturer and exporter
 Henry Edward Reynolds (1905–1980), mayor of Madison, Wisconsin
 Henry Revell Reynolds (1745–1811), English physician
 Henry Robert Reynolds (1825–1890), English minister and author

See also
Harry Reynolds (disambiguation)